Darkar or Darkar Achem is one of the subdistricts of the Zakho District in Dohuk Governorate in Kurdistan Region of Iraq. The town is 15 km northeast of Zakho.

Gallery

References

Subdistricts of Iraq
Zakho
Kurdish settlements in Iraq